

By competition 
Information correct as of 11 December 2018.

UEFA Cup 1993–94
Manager: Yuri Semin.

First round
 September 15, 1993 / Juventus F.C.  – FC Lokomotiv Moscow 3–0 (R. Baggio   Ravanelli ) / Stadio Renato Dall'Ara, Bologna / Attendance: 26,267
Juventus: Peruzzi, Carrera, Fortunato, Torricelli, Kohler, Júlio César, Marocchi, Conte, Ravanelli, R. Baggio (Del Piero, 89), Möller.
Lokomotiv: Ovchinnikov, Arifullin, Rakhimov, Podpaly (c), Sabitov, Drozdov, Kosolapov, Alenichev, Samatov, Smirnov (Gorkov, 64), Petrov (Garin, 54).

 September 28, 1993 / FC Lokomotiv Moscow - Juventus F.C. 0–1 (Marocchi ) / Lokomotiv Stadium, Moscow / Attendance: 10,000
Lokomotiv: Ovchinnikov, Arifullin, Rakhimov, Podpaly (c), Sabitov, Fuzaylov (Gorkov, 59), Kosolapov, Alenichev, Samatov, Smirnov, Nikulkin.
Juventus: Peruzzi, Carrera (Porrini, 46), Fortunato, Torricelli, Kohler, Júlio César, Conte (Galia, 75), D. Baggio, Ravanelli, Marocchi, Ban.

UEFA Cup 1995–96
Manager: Yuri Semin.

First round
 September 12, 1995 / FC Bayern Munich  – FC Lokomotiv Moscow 0–1 (Kharlachyov ) / Olympiastadion, Munich / Attendance: 24,000
Bayern Munich: Kahn, Babbel, Ziege, Strunz (Nerlinger, 15), Helmer, Sforza, Hamann, Zickler (Sutter, 46), Klinsmann, Herzog (Witeczek, 72), Scholl.
Lokomotiv: Ovchinnikov, Arifullin, Drozdov, Kharlachyov, Hovhannisyan, Chugaynov, Kosolapov, Gurenko, Yelyshev, Solomatin, Garin (Maminov, 82).

 September 26, 1995 / FC Lokomotiv Moscow - FC Bayern Munich 0–5 (Klinsmann   Herzog  Scholl  Strunz ) / Lokomotiv Stadium, Moscow / Attendance: 27,000
Lokomotiv: Ovchinnikov, Arifullin, Drozdov, Kharlachyov, Solomatin , Chugaynov, Kosolapov, Gurenko (Pashinin, 10, Maminov, 82), Yelyshev, Ye. Kuznetsov, Garin.
Bayern Munich: Kahn, Babbel, Ziege, Strunz (Frey, 87), Helmer, Sforza, Hamann (Zickler, 72), Herzog (Nerlinger, 62), Klinsmann, Scholl, Kostadinov.

UEFA Cup Winners' Cup 1996–97
Manager: Yuri Semin.

First round
 September 12, 1996 / FC Lokomotiv Moscow – NK Varteks  1–0 (Cherevchenko ) / Lokomotiv Stadium, Moscow / Attendance: 1,500
Lokomotiv: Ovchinnikov, Pashinin, Chugaynov, Cherevchenko (Arifullin, 86), Drozdov, Gurenko, Kharlachyov , Kosolapov (c), Yelyshev, Garin (Snigiryov, 55, Maminov, 73), Janashia.
Varteks: Solomun, Beli (Kovačević, 82), Gregorić, Maretić, Plantak, Borović, Težački (Ivančić, 88), Madunović, Brlenić, Vugrinec (c), Ivanković (Dasović, 77).

 September 26, 1996 / NK Varteks - FC Lokomotiv Moscow 2–1 (Vugrinec   – Kosolapov ) / Stadion Varteks, Varaždin / Attendance: 3,000
Varteks: Solomun, Borović, Kovačević (Ivanković, 43), Madunović, Plantak, Ivančić (Cvetko, 43), Posavec, Težački (Dasović, 66), Brlenić, Mumlek, Vugrinec (c).
Lokomotiv: Ovchinnikov, Solomatin, Hovhannisyan, Cherevchenko, Pashinin, Chugaynov, Kosolapov (c), Gurenko, Janashia (Snigiryov, 80), Maminov (Drozdov, 86), Haras (Yelyshev, 63).

Second round
 October 17, 1996 / S.L. Benfica  - FC Lokomotiv Moscow 1–0 (Pinto ) / Estádio da Luz, Lisbon / Attendance: 10,000
Benfica: Preud'homme, Calado, Bermúdez, Hélder, Dimas, Jamir, Caires (El Khalej, 57), Pinto (c), Nader (Edgar, 57), Valdo, Panduru.
Lokomotiv: Ovchinnikov, Cherevchenko, Drozdov, Kharlachyov, Hovhannisyan, Chugaynov, Kosolapov (c), Gurenko, Pashinin, Maminov (Smirnov, 59), Haras (Veselov, 70).

 October 31, 1996 / FC Lokomotiv Moscow – S.L. Benfica 2–3 (Solomatin  Haras  – Panduru  Donizete  Pinto ) / Lokomotiv Stadium, Moscow / Attendance: 7,000
Lokomotiv: Ovchinnikov, Cherevchenko, Drozdov, Kharlachyov, Pashinin, Chugaynov, Kosolapov (c), Gurenko, Solomatin, Maminov, Haras (Veselov, 76).
Benfica: Preud'homme, Calado, Bermúdez, Hélder, Dimas, Jamir (Panduru, 40), El Khalej, Pinto (c), Donizete (Airez, 82), Valdo, Iliev (Jorge Soares, 82).

UEFA Cup Winners' Cup 1997–98
Manager: Yuri Semin.

First round
 September 18, 1997 / FC Belshina Bobruisk  - FC Lokomotiv Moscow 1–2 (Khlebasolaw  – Loskov  Borodyuk ) / Dynama Stadium, Minsk / Attendance: 7,000
Belshina: Svirkov, Kovalevich, Timofeyev, Shustikov, Balashow, I. Gradoboyev, E. Gradoboyev, Khripach, Smirnykh (Borisik, 69), Khlebasolaw, Putrash (Kovtun, 63).
Lokomotiv: Podshivalov, Solomatin, Drozdov, Kharlachyov, Arifullin, Chugaynov (c), Smirnov, Borodyuk, Janashia (Bulykin, 79), Loskov, Cherevchenko.

 October 2, 1997 / FC Lokomotiv Moscow - FC Belshina Bobruisk 3–0 (Maminov  Kharlachyov  Loskov ) / Lokomotiv Stadium, Moscow / Attendance: 4,000
Lokomotiv: Bidzhiyev, Solomatin, Drozdov, Kharlachyov, Arifullin, Chugaynov (c), Smirnov (Sarkisyan, 64), Cherevchenko (Pashinin, 75), Janashia (Veselov, 69), Loskov, Maminov.
Belshina: Svirkov, Apalkov, Timofeyev, Khripach (Kovtun, 46), Razumovich, Kovalevich, I. Gradoboyev, E. Gradoboyev, Smirnykh (Putrash, 46), Balashow (Borisik, 65), Khlebasolaw.

Second round
 October 23, 1997 / FC Lokomotiv Moscow – Kocaelispor  2–1 (Kharlachyov  Janashia  - Turan ) / Lokomotiv Stadium, Moscow / Attendance: 3,500
Lokomotiv: Bidzhiyev, Solomatin, Drozdov (Pashinin, 90), Kharlachyov, Chugaynov (c), Gurenko, Cherevchenko, Veselov (Smirnov, 46), Maminov (Sarkisyan, 81), Janashia, Loskov.
Kocaelispor: Stângaciu, Mirković, Osman, Turan, Zeki, Evren, Faruk (Mustafa, 46), Moshoeu, Nuri, Soner, Metin.

 November 6, 1997 / Kocaelispor – FC Lokomotiv Moscow 0–0 / İzmit İsmetpaşa Stadium, İzmit / Attendance: 14,500
Kocaelispor: Stângaciu, Mirković, Metin, Osman (Evren, 65), Turan, Zeki, Nuri, Faruk (Dąbrowski, 54), Moshoeu, Soner (Ahmet, 84), Mustafa.
Lokomotiv: Bidzhiyev, Solomatin, Drozdov, Kharlachyov, Arifullin, Chugaynov (c), Gurenko, Smirnov (Sarkisyan, 82), Veselov (Maminov, 73), Pashinin, Loskov.

Quarter-finals
 March 5, 1998 / AEK Athens F.C.  – FC Lokomotiv Moscow 0–0 / Nikos Goumas Stadium, Athens / Attendance: 27,000
AEK Athens: Atmatsidis, Kopitsis (Sebwe, 59), Manolas, Karagiannis , Kasapis, Grétarsson, Macheridis (Doboş, 66 ), Marcelo, Savevski, Nikolaidis, Maladenis.
Lokomotiv: Nigmatullin, Solomatin, Drozdov, Cherevchenko, Arifullin, Chugaynov (c), Kosolapov, Gurenko, Borodyuk (Smirnov, 69), Loskov (Maminov, 46), Haras (Janashia, 46).

 March 19, 1998 / FC Lokomotiv Moscow – AEK Athens F.C. 2–1 (Kharlachyov  Chugaynov  - Kopitsis ) / Lokomotiv Stadium, Moscow / Attendance: 11,256
Lokomotiv: Nigmatullin, Solomatin, Cherevchenko, Kharlachyov, Arifullin, Chugaynov (c), Kosolapov, Gurenko, Maminov, Loskov (Janashia, 25), Haras.
AEK Athens: Atmatsidis, Kopitsis, Manolas, Kalitzakis, Kostenoglou, Kasapis, Grétarsson, Macheridis, Savevski (Sebwe, 64), Maladenis (Kefalas, 87), Nikolaidis.

Semi-finals
 April 2, 1998 / VfB Stuttgart  – FC Lokomotiv Moscow 2–1 (Akpoborie  Bobic  - Janashia ) / Gottlieb-Daimler-Stadion, Stuttgart / Attendance: 14,500
Stuttgart: Wohlfahrt, Spanring, Verlaat, Berthold, Poschner, Haber, Stojkovski (Hagner, 46), Yakin (Lisztes, 71), Balakov, Akpoborie, Bobic.
Lokomotiv: Nigmatullin, Solomatin, Drozdov, Kharlachyov, Arifullin, Chugaynov (c), Kosolapov (Maminov, 55), Gurenko, Janashia, Cherevchenko, Haras (Smirnov, 55).

 April 16, 1998 / FC Lokomotiv Moscow – VfB Stuttgart 0–1 (Bobic ) / Lokomotiv Stadium, Moscow / Attendance: 20,000
Lokomotiv: Nigmatullin, Solomatin, Maminov, Kharlachyov, Arifullin, Chugaynov (c), Kosolapov, Gurenko, Janashia, Loskov (Veselov, 59), Smirnov (Hovhannisyan, 73).
Stuttgart: Wohlfahrt, Spanring, Stojkovski, Berthold, Verlaat, Soldo, Poschner (Schneider, 90), Haber, Akpoborie (Endreß, 82), Balakov, Bobic.

UEFA Cup Winners' Cup 1998–99
Manager: Yuri Semin.

First round
 September 17, 1998 / CSKA Kyiv  – FC Lokomotiv Moscow 0–2 (Kharlachyov  Janashia ) / Dynamo Stadium, Kyiv / Attendance: 6,500
CSKA Kyiv: Reva, Levchenko, Balytskiy, Ulyanitskiy, Hrehul, Bezhenar, Oliynyk (Novokhatskiy, 78), Kostyshyn (Oleksienko, 26), Zakarlyuka (Daraselia, 53), Leonenko, Tsykhmeystruk (c).
Lokomotiv: Nigmatullin, Arifullin, Drozdov, Kharlachyov, Pashinin, Chugaynov (c), Solomatin, Gurenko, Janashia (Bulykin, 90), Borodyuk (Haras, 80), Lavrik.

 October 1, 1998 / FC Lokomotiv Moscow – CSKA Kyiv 3–1 (Bulykin   Janashia  – Bezhenar ) / Lokomotiv Stadium, Moscow / Attendance: 5,000
Lokomotiv: Nigmatullin, Arifullin (Cherevchenko, 74), Drozdov (Loskov, 57), Kharlachyov, Lavrik, Chugaynov (c), Solomatin, Gurenko, Janashia, Borodyuk, Bulykin (Pashinin, 70).
CSKA Kyiv: Reva, Levchenko , Novokhatskiy (Revut, 46), Balytskiy, Hrehul, Bezhenar, Karyaka (Daraselia, 73), Shkapenko, Zakarlyuka, Leonenko (Korenev, 46), Tsykhmeystruk (c).

Second round
 October 22, 1998 / FC Lokomotiv Moscow – S.C. Braga  3–1 (Bulykin   Chugaynov  – Odair ) / Lokomotiv Stadium, Moscow / Attendance: 16,100
Lokomotiv: Nigmatullin, Cherevchenko, Drozdov, Kharlachyov (Sarkisyan, 81), Solomatin, Chugaynov (c), Borodyuk, Gurenko, Janashia, Loskov (Lavrik, 90), Bulykin.
Braga: Morais , Azevedo, Odair, Mozer, Sérgio, Silva (Quim, 89), Lino, Karoglan (Toni, 75), Artur Jorge (Castanheira, 74), Jordão, Bruno.

 November 5, 1998 / S.C. Braga – FC Lokomotiv Moscow 1–0 (Karoglan ) / Estádio Primeiro de Maio, Braga / Attendance: 10,000
Braga: Quim, Azevedo, Odair, Mozer, Silva, Lino (Formoso, 66), Karoglan, Artur Jorge (Sérgio, 83), Jordão, Gamboa (Toni, 60), Bruno.
Lokomotiv: Nigmatullin, Cherevchenko, Drozdov (Lavrik, 32), Kharlachyov (Sarkisyan, 64), Solomatin, Chugaynov (c), Borodyuk, Gurenko, Janashia (Arifullin, 89), Loskov, Bulykin.

Quarter-finals
 March 4, 1999 / FC Lokomotiv Moscow – Maccabi Haifa  3–0 (Janashia   ) / Lokomotiv Stadium, Moscow / Attendance: 22,000
Lokomotiv: Nigmatullin, Arifullin (Cherevchenko, 36), Drozdov, Sarkisyan (Kharlachyov, 60), Solomatin (Lavrik, 43), Chugaynov (c), Smertin, Gurenko, Janashia, Loskov, Bulykin.
Maccabi Haifa: Davidovich, Harazi, Benado, Keisi, Hromádko (Duro, 63), Nagar, Benayoun (Silvas, 86), Jano, Harazi (Paço, 73), Melamed, Brzęczek.

 March 18, 1999 / Maccabi Haifa – FC Lokomotiv Moscow 0–1 (Chugaynov ) / Kiryat Eliezer Stadium, Haifa / Attendance: 18,500
Maccabi Haifa: Davidovich, Jano, Harazi, Benado, Keisi, Kopel, Nagar (Duro, 75), Brzęczek, Paço (Hromádko, 70), Benayoun, Harazi (Katan, 32).
Lokomotiv: Nigmatullin, Arifullin, Drozdov, Maminov (Sarkisyan, 81), Lavrik, Chugaynov  (c), Smertin, Gurenko, Janashia, Loskov (Kharlachyov, 46), Bulykin (Borodyuk, 68).

Semi-finals
 April 8, 1999 / FC Lokomotiv Moscow – Lazio  1–1 (Janashia  – Bokšić ) / Lokomotiv Stadium, Moscow / Attendance: 23,000
Lokomotiv: Nigmatullin, Arifullin, Drozdov, Kharlachyov (Maminov, 83), Cherevchenko, Chugaynov (c), Smertin (Loskov, 46), Gurenko, Janashia, Lavrik, Bulykin (Borodyuk, 83).
Lazio: Marchegiani, Negro, Pancaro, de la Peña, Favalli (c), Mihajlović, Lombardo, Almeyda, Salas (Mancini, 74), Stanković, Vieri (Bokšić, 63).

 April 22, 1999 / Lazio – FC Lokomotiv Moscow 0–0 / Stadio Olimpico, Rome / Attendance: 20,000
Lazio: Marchegiani, Negro, Nesta (c), Couto (Almeyda, 46), Pancaro, Mihajlović, Lombardo, Nedvěd, Stanković, Mancini (de la Peña, 76), Vieri (Bokšić, 88).
Lokomotiv: Nigmatullin, Arifullin, Lavrik, Kharlachyov (Maminov, 66; Borodyuk, 84), Cherevchenko, Chugaynov (c), Smertin, Gurenko, Janashia, Loskov, Bulykin.

UEFA Cup 1999–2000
Manager: Yuri Semin.

Qualifying round
 August 12, 1999 /  BATE – FC Lokomotiv Moscow 1–7 (Lisovskiy  - Janashia    Loskov  Sarkisyan  Bulykin  ) / Haradzki Stadium, Barysaw / Attendance: 6,000
BATE: Fyedarovich, Goncharenko, Skripchenko, Tikhomirov, Lashankow, Yermakovich (Lisovskiy, 36), Arzamastsev (Baranaw, 20), Nevinskiy, Kutuzov, Kuznyatsow (Miroshkin, 62), Pyatrawskas.
Lokomotiv: Nigmatullin, Cherevchenko, Lavrik, Kharlachyov, Hovhannisyan (Drozdov, 50), Chugaynov (c), Smertin (Maminov, 71), Pashinin, Janashia, Loskov (Bulykin, 46), Sarkisyan.

 August 25, 1999 / FC Lokomotiv Moscow – BATE 5–0 (Chugaynov  Loskov  Smertin  Kharlachyov  ) / Lokomotiv Stadium, Moscow / Attendance: 9,000
Lokomotiv: Poliakov, Arifullin, Drozdov, Lavrik, Solomatin (Pashinin, 46), Chugaynov (c), Smertin (Kharlachyov, 46), Sarkisyan, Maminov, Loskov, Bulykin (Pimenov, 46).
BATE: Khamutowski, Miroshkin, Rahozhkin (Kuznyatsow, 46), Arzamastsev, Tikhomirov, Lashankow (Akulich, 59), Nevinskiy, Dzivakow, Skripchenko, Goncharenko (Doroshkevich, 46), Baranaw.

First round
 September 16, 1999 /  Lyngby BK - FC Lokomotiv Moscow 1–2 (Bidstrup  – Chugaynov  Bulykin ) / Lyngby Stadion, Kongens Lyngby / Attendance: 1,474
Lyngby: Fahlström, Bidstrup (Andie, 79), Johansen (c), Birn, Hermansen, Magleby, Hindsberg (Havlykke, 46), Vinzents, Jensen, M. Petersen, Lars Larsen.
Lokomotiv: Nigmatullin, Arifullin (Solomatin, 83), Drozdov (Maminov, 46), Kharlachyov, Hovhannisyan (Cherevchenko, 66), Chugaynov (c), Smertin, Sarkisyan, Pashinin, Loskov, Bulykin.

 September 30, 1999 / FC Lokomotiv Moscow - Lyngby BK 3–0 (Kharlachyov  Drozdov  Janashia ) / Lokomotiv Stadium, Moscow / Attendance: 8,000
Lokomotiv: Nigmatullin, Arifullin, Drozdov, Kharlachyov, Cherevchenko , Chugaynov (c), Smertin (Solomatin, 62), Pashinin, Janashia (Maminov, 70), Loskov (Semenenko, 46), Sarkisyan.
Lyngby: Fahlström, Ayeni , Tengstedt (Jensen, 58), Johansen (c), Birn, Hermansen (Lüthje, 76), Magleby, Hindsberg, Vinzents (Christensen, 58), M. Petersen, Lars Larsen.

Second round
 October 21, 1999 /  Leeds United - FC Lokomotiv Moscow 4–1 (Bowyer   Smith  Kewell  – Loskov ) / Elland Road, Leeds / Attendance: 37,814
Leeds United: Martyn, Kelly, Harte, McPhail, Radebe (c), Woodgate, Smith, Bridges (Huckerby, 62), Batty, Kewell, Bowyer.
Lokomotiv: Nigmatullin, Arifullin, Drozdov, Kharlachyov, Lavrik, Chugaynov (c), Smertin, Pashinin (Hovhannisyan, 60), Janashia (Bulykin, 39), Loskov, Sarkisyan (Maminov, 76).

 November 4, 1999 / FC Lokomotiv Moscow - Leeds United 0–3 (Harte  Bridges  ) / Lokomotiv Stadium, Moscow / Attendance: 9,850
Lokomotiv: Nigmatullin, Arifullin, Lavrik, Pashinin (Kharlachyov, 46), Hovhannisyan (Semenenko, 77), Chugaynov (c), Smertin, Solomatin, Bulykin (Pimenov, 74), Loskov, Sarkisyan.
Leeds United: Martyn, Kelly, Harte, Batty, Radebe (c), Woodgate, McPhail (Hopkin, 80), Bridges, Bakke, Kewell (Huckerby, 66), Bowyer (Haaland, 46).

UEFA Champions League 2000–01
Manager: Yuri Semin.

Third qualifying round
 August 8, 2000 /  Beşiktaş – FC Lokomotiv Moscow 3–0 (Nihat  Nouma  Karhan ) / BJK İnönü Stadium, Istanbul / Attendance: 20,000
Beşiktaş: Shorunmu, Karhan, Tayfur (c), Ümit (Rahim, 46), Halilagić, Khlestov (Erman, 38), Ahmet (Murat, 60), Nouma, Nihat, Mehmet, Münch.
Lokomotiv: Nigmatullin, Nizhegorodov, Drozdov, Evseev, Pashinin, Chugaynov (c), Bulykin (Sarkisyan, 83), Lavrik, Janashia (Pimenov, 65), Loskov, Kharlachyov (Solomatin, 57).

 August 23, 2000 / FC Lokomotiv Moscow - Beşiktaş 1–3 (Cherevchenko  – Nouma  Nihat  Tayfur ) / Lokomotiv Stadium, Moscow / Attendance: 18,000
Lokomotiv: Nigmatullin, Cherevchenko, Drozdov (Evseev, 69), Lavrik, Nizhegorodov, Chugaynov (c), Sarkisyan, Pimenov, Janashia (Bulykin, 68), Loskov, Kharlachyov (Azevedo, 46).
Beşiktaş: Shorunmu, Karhan (Yasin, 80), Tayfur (c), Ümit, Halilagić (Rahim, 84), Nihat, Ahmet, Erman, Nouma (Khlestov, 63), İbrahim, Münch.

UEFA Cup 2000–01
Manager: Yuri Semin.

First round
 September 14, 2000 / FC Lokomotiv Moscow –  Naftex Burgas 4–2 (Sarkisyan  Tsymbalar  Janashia  Pimenov  – Petrov  Timnev ) / Luzhniki Stadium, Moscow / Attendance: 5,000
Lokomotiv: Nigmatullin, Cherevchenko, Drozdov, Evseev, Sennikov, Chugaynov (c), Sarkisyan, Pimenov (Bulykin, 64), Janashia, Kharlachyov, Tsymbalar (Maminov, 60).
Naftex Burgas: Simeonov, Hristov, Branimirov, Krastev, Petrov, Parola (Sakaliev, 69), Kiselichkov, Dimitrov, Timnev (Petkov, 85), Trendafilov (Mechechiev, 69), Orachev.

 September 28, 2000 / Naftex Burgas – FC Lokomotiv Moscow 0–0 / Neftochimik Stadium, Burgas / Attendance: 13,000
Naftex Burgas: Gospodinov, Hristov (Ibraimov, 52), Branimirov, Krastev (Sakaliev, 77), Petrov, Parola, Kiselichkov, Dimitrov, Timnev, Trendafilov (Spasov, 62), Orachev.
Lokomotiv: Nigmatullin, Nizhegorodov, Drozdov, Evseev, Pashinin, Chugaynov (c), Sennikov, Lavrik, Janashia (Bulykin, 80), Pimenov (Maminov, 46), Kharlachyov.

Second round
 October 26, 2000 / FC Lokomotiv Moscow –  Inter Bratislava 1–0 (Loskov ) / Dynamo Stadium, Moscow / Attendance: 4,000
Lokomotiv: Nigmatullin, Nizhegorodov, Drozdov, Evseev, Pashinin (Cherevchenko, 41), Chugaynov (c), Sarkisyan, Sennikov, Janashia (Teryokhin, 79), Loskov, Maminov (Kharlachyov, 60).
Inter Bratislava: Hýll (c), Čišovský, Šuchančok, Ševela, Dzúrik, Ľalík (Gerich, 79), Kratochvíl, Chrenko, Németh, Babnič (Czinege, 60), Pinte.

 November 9, 2000 / Inter Bratislava - FC Lokomotiv Moscow 1–2 (Čišovský  – Chugaynov  Janashia ) / Inter-Bratislava Stadium, Bratislava / Attendance: 3,280
Inter Bratislava: Hýll (c), Hornyák, Šuchančok, Gerich, Dzúrik, Ľalík (Čišovský, 46), Kratochvíl, Chrenko, Czinege, Babnič, Németh.
Lokomotiv: Nigmatullin, Nizhegorodov, Drozdov, Evseev, Cherevchenko (Kharlachyov, 77), Chugaynov (c), Sarkisyan, Sennikov, Janashia, Loskov (Maminov, 52), Bulykin (Lavrik, 65).

Third round
 November 23, 2000 / FC Lokomotiv Moscow -  Rayo Vallecano 0–0 / Lokomotiv Stadium, Moscow / Attendance: 7,500
Lokomotiv: Nigmatullin, Nizhegorodov, Drozdov, Evseev (Lavrik, 85), Cherevchenko, Chugaynov (c), Sarkisyan (Maminov, 55), Sennikov, Janashia (Teryokhin, 65), Kharlachyov, Bulykin.
Rayo Vallecano: Keller, Mingo, de Quintana, Alcázar (Bolo, 46), Míchel (Setvalls, 85), Quevedo, Bolić (Iglesias, 76), Ballesteros, Mauro, Poschner, Pablo Sanz.

 December 7, 2000 / Rayo Vallecano – FC Lokomotiv Moscow 2–0 (Bolić  Alcázar ) / Estadio Teresa Rivero, Madrid / Attendance: 10,000
Rayo Vallecano: Keller, Mingo, de Quintana, Alcázar, Míchel, Quevedo (Setvalls, 83), Bolić (Pablo Sanz, 73), Ballesteros, Poschner, Bolo, Helder (Mauro, 46).
Lokomotiv: Nigmatullin, Nizhegorodov, Drozdov, Evseev, Cherevchenko, Chugaynov (c), Sarkisyan (Janashia, 69), Sennikov, Maminov, Kharlachyov, Bulykin.

UEFA Champions League 2001–02
Manager: Yuri Semin.

Third qualifying round
 August 7, 2001 / FC Lokomotiv Moscow -  Tirol Innsbruck 3–1 (Lekgetho  Izmailov  Ignashevich  – Kirchler ) / Saturn Stadium, Ramenskoye / Attendance: 16,000
Lokomotiv: Nigmatullin, Nizhegorodov, Lekgetho, Chugaynov (c), Izmailov, Maminov, Obiorah (Buznikin, 72), Loskov (Ignashevich, 75), Sennikov, Obradović, Pimenov (Janashia, 61).
Tirol Innsbruck: Ziegler, Ibertsberger, Kogler, Wazinger, Zwyssig, Kirchler (c), Panis (Prudlo, 34), Ježek (Scharrer, 74), Gilewicz, Brzęczek, Hörtnagl.

 August 22, 2001 / Tirol Innsbruck - FC Lokomotiv Moscow 0–1 (Maminov ) / Tivoli-Neu, Innsbruck / Attendance: 18,000
Tirol Innsbruck: Ziegler, Ibertsberger, Kogler, Ježek, Zwyssig, Kirchler, Marasek, Baur (c), Gilewicz, Brzęczek, Scharrer (Mair, 46; Glieder, 72).
Lokomotiv: Nigmatullin, Nizhegorodov, Obradović, Lekgetho, Ignashevich, Chugaynov (c), Izmailov (Maminov, 46), Pimenov (Drozdov, 78), Obiorah, Loskov, Sennikov.

FC Tirol Innsbruck claimed that there was a Russian player (Pimenov) who should have been sent off in the last minutes of the game, since he had already been booked with a yellow card and the referee, Mario van der Ende, showed the second card to the wrong player. UEFA decided that the whole game be repeated at the same venue and the original score be cancelled.

 September 8, 2001 / Tirol Innsbruck – FC Lokomotiv Moscow 1–0 (Brzęczek ) / Tivoli-Neu, Innsbruck / Attendance: 15,500
Tirol Innsbruck: Ziegler, Ibertsberger (Glieder, 61), Kogler, Ježek, Zwyssig, Kirchler, Marasek (Sidibe, 77), Baur (c), Gilewicz, Brzęczek, Hörtnagl .
Lokomotiv: Nigmatullin, Nizhegorodov, Lekgetho, Ignashevich, Chugaynov (c), Izmailov, Maminov, Obiorah, Loskov (Janashia, 57), Sennikov, Obradović.

First group stage, Group A
 September 11, 2001 / FC Lokomotiv Moscow -  Anderlecht 1–1 (Maminov  – Hendrikx ) / Dynamo Stadium, Moscow / Attendance: 18,500
Lokomotiv: Nigmatullin, Sennikov, Drozdov, Lekgetho, Ignashevich, Chugaynov (c), Izmailov, Maminov, Obradović, Pimenov (Janashia, 75), Buznikin (Vučićević, 66).
Anderlecht: De Wilde, Ilić, Hendrikx, Vanderhaeghe, De Boeck (c), Crasson, Hasi, Dindane (Seol, 88), Mornar (Van Hout, 90+2), De Bilde (Stoica, 77), Pirard.

 September 19, 2001 /  Real Madrid - FC Lokomotiv Moscow 4–0 (Munitis  Figo  Roberto Carlos  Sávio ) / Santiago Bernabéu Stadium, Madrid / Attendance: 45,000
Real Madrid: Casillas, Salgado, Roberto Carlos (Solari, 84), Hierro, Karanka, Conceição (Celades, 77), Raúl, Makélélé, Munitis, Figo (McManaman, 88), Sávio.
Lokomotiv: Nigmatullin, Drozdov, Lekgetho, Chugaynov (c), Izmailov, Maminov, Obiorah, Loskov (Buznikin, 60), Cherevchenko, Obradović (Vučićević, 75), Pimenov.

 September 26, 2001 /  Roma – FC Lokomotiv Moscow 2–1 (Chugaynov  Totti  - Obradović ) / Stadio Olimpico, Rome / Attendance: 40,000
Roma: Antonioli, Cafu (Guigou, 61), Zebina, Samuel, Zago, Candela, Tommasi (Assunção, 61), Lima, Totti, Montella (Batistuta, 46), Delvecchio.
Lokomotiv: Nigmatullin, Chugaynov (c), Cherevchenko, Obradović, Maminov, Izmailov, Lekgetho, Loskov, Drozdov, Pimenov (Buznikin, 73), Ignashevich.

 October 16, 2001 / FC Lokomotiv Moscow – Roma 0–1 (Cafu ) / Dynamo Stadium, Moscow / Attendance: 16,000
Lokomotiv: Nigmatullin, Lekgetho, Ignashevich, Chugaynov (c), Izmailov, Maminov, Obiorah, Loskov, Cherevchenko, Obradović, Pimenov.
Roma: Antonioli, Cafu (Fuser, 90+1), Zago, Lima, Totti (c), Emerson, Zebina, Tommasi (Assunção, 83), Samuel, Batistuta, Guigou.

 October 24, 2001 / Anderlecht - FC Lokomotiv Moscow 1–5 (Ilić  – Izmailov  Sennikov  Pimenov  Buznikin  ) / Constant Vanden Stock Stadium, Brussels / Attendance: 22,502
Anderlecht: De Wilde, Ilić, Hendrikx, Vanderhaeghe, De Boeck (c), Crasson, El-Said (De Bilde, 46), Dindane (Jestrović, 64), Mornar, Hasi, Iachtchouk (Karaca, 52).
Lokomotiv: Nigmatullin, Sennikov, Lekgetho (Nizhegorodov, 84), Ignashevich, Chugaynov (c), Cherevchenko, Obiorah (Buznikin, 54), Izmailov, Maminov, Loskov, Pimenov (Drozdov, 76).

 October 30, 2001 / FC Lokomotiv Moscow - Real Madrid 2–0 (Buznikin  Cherevchenko ) / Dynamo Stadium, Moscow / Attendance: 15,000
Lokomotiv: Nigmatullin, Lekgetho, Ignashevich, Chugaynov (c) (Obradović, 24), Izmailov, Maminov, Loskov, Buznikin (Obiorah, 74), Cherevchenko (Drozdov, 78), Sennikov, Pimenov.
Real Madrid: César, Helguera, McManaman (Valdo, 61), Morientes (c) (Aranda, 61), Celades, Solari, Munitis, Makélélé (Rubén, 72), Miñambres, Bravo, Pavón.

UEFA Cup 2001–02
Manager: Yuri Semin.

Third round
 November 20, 2001 /  Hapoel Tel Aviv – FC Lokomotiv Moscow 2–1 (Osterc  Domb  - Izmailov ) / Bloomfield Stadium, Tel Aviv / Attendance: 14,500
Hapoel Tel Aviv: Elimelech, Bakhar, Gershon (c), Domb (Hilel, 90+3), Antebi, Abukasis, Halmai, Onyshchenko (Balili, 86), Tuama (Luz, 63), Osterc, Cleşcenco.
Lokomotiv: Nigmatullin, Ignashevich, Cherevchenko , Sennikov, Lekgetho, Obradović, Maminov, Loskov (c), Izmailov, Pimenov (Sarkisyan, 84), Obiorah.

 December 4, 2001 / FC Lokomotiv Moscow – Hapoel Tel Aviv 0–1 (Osterc ) / Saturn Stadium, Ramenskoye / Attendance: 12,000
Lokomotiv: Nigmatullin, Nizhegorodov, Ignashevich, Sennikov, Sarkisyan (Obiorah, 61), Vučićević, Maminov, Izmailov, Loskov (c), Pimenov, Buznikin.
Hapoel Tel Aviv: Elimelech, Bakhar, Gershon (c), Domb, Antebi, Pisont (Luz, 79), Halmai, Onyshchenko, Tuama (Hilel, 90+2), Cleşcenco (Balili, 74), Osterc.

UEFA Champions League 2002–03
Manager: Yuri Semin.

Third qualifying round
 August 14, 2002 /  Grazer AK - FC Lokomotiv Moscow 0–2 (Lekgetho  Loskov ) / Arnold Schwarzenegger Stadium, Graz / Attendance: 6,000
GAK: Schranz (Almer, 46), Pötscher, Tokić, Ramusch, Milinković, Amerhauser (Halmosi, 70), Hartmann, Aufhauser, Bazina, Brunmayr (c), Kollmann (Naumoski, 76).
Lokomotiv: Ovchinnikov, Nizhegorodov, Ignashevich, Pashinin, Drozdov, Evseev (Sennikov, 55), Lekgetho, Maminov, Loskov (c), Pimenov (Júlio César, 80), Buznikin (Vučićević, 75).

 August 28, 2002 / FC Lokomotiv Moscow – Grazer AK 3–3 (Ignashevich  Evseev  Júlio César  - Naumoski  Bazina  Aufhauser ) / Lokomotiv Stadium, Moscow / Attendance: 14,000
Lokomotiv: Ovchinnikov, Evseev, Nizhegorodov, Ignashevich, Pashinin, Lekgetho, Maminov, Loskov (c)  (Vučićević, 46; Drozdov, 65), Sirkhayev, Júlio César, Buznikin.
GAK: Almer, Ehmann, Tokić, Hartmann  (Halmosi, 51), Ramusch, Čeh, Aufhauser, Bazina, Dmitrović, Naumoski, Brunmayr (c).

Group stage
 September 18, 2002 / FC Lokomotiv Moscow –  Galatasaray 0–2 (Sarr  Arif ) / Lokomotiv Stadium, Moscow / Attendance: 20,000
Lokomotiv Moscow: Ovchinnikov, Evseev, Nizhegorodov, Ignashevich, Pashinin (Sennikov, 60), Lekgetho, Drozdov, Maminov, Loskov (c), Júlio César (Baba Adamu, 74), Buznikin (Pimenov, 46).
Galatasaray: Mondragón, Ümit Davala, Almaguer, Bülent (c), Hakan, Batista, Ayhan (Fábio Pinto, 46), Ergün, Felipe, Hasan (Sarr, 70), Arif (Emre, 84).

 September 24, 2002 /  Club Brugge - FC Lokomotiv Moscow 0–0 / Jan Breydel Stadium, Bruges / Attendance: 28,000
Brugge: Verlinden (c), De Cock, Simons, Van Der Heyden, Špilár (Clement, 61), Verheyen, Englebert, Serebrennikov, Mendoza (Stoica, 66), Lange, Maertens.
Lokomotiv: Ovchinnikov, Nizhegorodov, Ignashevich, Sennikov, Lekgetho, Evseev, Maminov (Obradović, 46), Loskov (c) , Pimenov, Buznikin (Sirkhayev, 46), Júlio César (Obiorah, 75).

 October 1, 2002 / FC Lokomotiv Moscow –  Barcelona 1–3 (Obiorah  - Kluivert  Saviola  ) / Lokomotiv Stadium, Moscow / Attendance: 20,000
Lokomotiv: Ovchinnikov (c), Sennikov, Ignashevich, Nizhegorodov, Obradović, Evseev, Drozdov, Maminov, Lekgetho, Obiorah (Buznikin, 66), Pimenov.
Barcelona: Valdés, Puyol, de Boer, Navarro, Mendieta, Xavi, Cocu, Motta, Saviola (Rochemback, 86), Luis Enrique (c) (Geovanni, 61), Kluivert (Gerard, 74).

 October 23, 2002 / Barcelona – FC Lokomotiv Moscow 1–0 (de Boer ) / Camp Nou, Barcelona / Attendance: 30,000
Barcelona: Bonano, Navarro, de Boer, Puyol, Xavi, Cocu (c), Gabri, Mendieta (Rochemback, 66), Riquelme, Saviola, Kluivert.
Lokomotiv: Ovchinnikov, Ignashevich, Pashinin, Sennikov, Maminov, Evseev, Obradović, Loskov (c), Pimenov, Obiorah, Júlio César (Buznikin, 84).

 October 29, 2002 / Galatasaray - FC Lokomotiv Moscow 1–2 (Hasan  – Loskov  Evseev ) / Ali Sami Yen Stadium, Istanbul / Attendance: 20,000
Galatasaray: Mondragón, Hakan, Bülent  (c), Emre, Ümit Davala, Cihan (Felipe, 71), Fábio Pinto, Ergün, Baljić (Hasan, 46), Arif (Batista, 46), Christian.
Lokomotiv: Ovchinnikov, Ignashevich, Nizhegorodov, Pashinin, Sennikov, Maminov, Evseev, Lekgetho, Loskov (c), Pimenov, Obiorah (Júlio César, 78).

 November 13, 2002 / FC Lokomotiv Moscow - Club Brugge 2–0 (Júlio César  Loskov ) / Lokomotiv Stadium, Moscow / Attendance: 19,000
Lokomotiv: Ovchinnikov, Nizhegorodov, Pashinin, Sennikov, Evseev, Ignashevich, Maminov, Loskov (c), Lekgetho, Júlio César (Baba Adamu, 90+1), Buznikin (Obiorah, 66).
Brugge: Verlinden (c), De Cock, Maertens, Clement, Van Der Heyden, Englebert, Simons, Stoica (Čeh, 84), Martens, Verheyen, Mendoza (Lešnjak, 73).

Second group stage
 November 26, 2002 / FC Lokomotiv Moscow –  Borussia Dortmund 1–2 (Ignashevich  – Frings  Koller ) / Lokomotiv Stadium, Moscow / Attendance: 22,000
Lokomotiv: Ovchinnikov, Nizhegorodov, Pashinin, Sennikov, Evseev, Ignashevich, Maminov (Obradović, 46), Loskov (c), Lekgetho, Obiorah (Buznikin, 65), Pimenov (Baba Adamu, 74).
Borussia Dortmund: Lehmann, Wörns, Reuter (c), Metzelder, Heinrich, Frings, Kehl (Madouni, 89), Rosický (Reina, 90+1), Dedê, Koller, Ewerthon (Ricken, 83).

 December 11, 2002 /  Real Madrid – FC Lokomotiv Moscow 2–2 (Raúl   – Obiorah  Mnguni ) / Santiago Bernabéu Stadium, Madrid / Attendance: 52,000
Real Madrid: Casillas, Salgado, Roberto Carlos, Hierro (c), Zidane, Raúl, Figo, Ronaldo (Guti, 46), Cambiasso (Morientes, 77), Pavón, Makélélé (Conceição, 32).
Lokomotiv: Ovchinnikov, Nizhegorodov, Lekgetho, Ignashevich, Maminov, Loskov (c), Júlio César (Obiorah, 46), Pashinin, Evseev, Mnguni, Pimenov (Drozdov, 81).

 February 19, 2003 /  Milan – FC Lokomotiv Moscow 1–0 (Tomasson ) / San Siro, Milan / Attendance: 72,028
Milan: Dida, Maldini (c), Nesta, Costacurta, Gattuso, Pirlo, Brocchi (Šimić, 79), Costa (Serginho, 63), Rivaldo, Inzaghi, Tomasson (Seedorf, 68).
Lokomotiv: Ovchinnikov, Nizhegorodov, Pashinin, Sennikov, Lekgetho, Obradović, Ignashevich (Parks, 83), Maminov, Loskov (c), Buznikin (Izmailov, 46), Pimenov.

 February 25, 2003 / FC Lokomotiv Moscow - Milan 0–1 (Rivaldo ) / Lokomotiv Stadium, Moscow / Attendance: 30,000
Lokomotiv: Ovchinnikov, Nizhegorodov, Ignashevich, Sirkhayev (Pimenov, 58), Izmailov, Maminov, Loskov (c), Júlio César (Parks, 82), Evseev, Sennikov, Mnguni.
Milan: Dida, Maldini (c), Kaladze, Redondo (Brocchi, 76), Gattuso, Inzaghi (Tomasson, 84), Rivaldo, Nesta, Costacurta, Seedorf, Serginho (Costa, 86).

 March 12, 2003 / Borussia Dortmund – FC Lokomotiv Moscow 3–0 (Frings  Koller  Amoroso ) / Westfalenstadion, Dortmund / Attendance: 48,000
Borussia Dortmund: Lehmann, Evanílson, Reuter (c), Wörns, Metzelder, Frings, Kehl, Dedê (Madouni, 20), Koller (Ricken, 70), Ewerthon, Amoroso.
Lokomotiv: Ovchinnikov (c), Lekgetho, Ignashevich, Pashinin, Evseev, Sennikov, Mnguni, Izmailov, Maminov, Obradović (Júlio César, 46), Pimenov.

 March 18, 2003 / FC Lokomotiv Moscow - Real Madrid 0–1 (Ronaldo ) / Lokomotiv Stadium, Moscow / Attendance: 26,000
Lokomotiv: Ovchinnikov, Nizhegorodov, Ignashevich, Izmailov, Maminov (Sirkhayev, 81), Loskov (c), Pashinin, Evseev, Sennikov, Mnguni (Júlio César, 72), Pimenov.
Real Madrid: Casillas, Salgado, Zidane (Cambiasso, 90), Helguera, Raúl (c), Figo, Ronaldo (Guti, 81), Conceição, Solari, Pavón, Makélélé.

UEFA Champions League 2003–04
Manager: Yuri Semin.

Third qualifying round
 August 13, 2003 /  Shakhtar Donetsk – FC Lokomotiv Moscow 1–0 (Vukić ) / Shakhtar Stadium, Donetsk / Attendance: 31,000
Shakhtar Donetsk: Pletikosa, Tymoshchuk (c), Popov, Bakharev (Srna, 81), Vukić, Vorobey, Lewandowski, Gai, Byelik (Aghahowa, 61), Pažin, Raţ.
Lokomotiv: Ovchinnikov, Nizhegorodov, Lekgetho, Ignashevich, Maminov, Loskov (c) (Buznikin, 67), Pashinin , Parks, Sennikov, Khokhlov, Ashvetia (Izmailov, 41; Wagner, 74).

 August 27, 2003 / FC Lokomotiv Moscow – Shakhtar Donetsk 3–1 (Ashvetia   Ignashevich  - Lewandowski ) / Lokomotiv Stadium, Moscow / Attendance: 29,000
Lokomotiv: Ovchinnikov, Nizhegorodov, Lekgetho, Ignashevich, Izmailov (Sennikov, 88), Maminov, Loskov (c), Buznikin (Leandro, 65), Evseev, Khokhlov, Ashvetia.
Shakhtar Donetsk: Pletikosa, Tymoshchuk (c), Popov (Byelik, 90+2), Bakharev, Vukić (Srna, 76), Vorobey, Lewandowski, Gai, Pažin, Brandão (Aghahowa, 69), Raţ.

Group stage
 September 17, 2003 /  Dynamo Kyiv – FC Lokomotiv Moscow 2–0 (Rincón  ) / Olimpiysky National Sports Complex, Kyiv / Attendance: 78,000
Dynamo Kyiv: Shovkovskyi, Dmytrulin (Khatskevich, 46), Gavrančić, Fedorov, Nesmachniy, Husyev (Rincón, 62), Ghioane (Cernat, 79), Leko, Byalkevich (c), Peev, Shatskikh.
Lokomotiv: Ovchinnikov, Sennikov, Nizhegorodov, Pashinin, Ignashevich, Lekgetho, Maminov, Izmailov (Leandro, 87), Loskov (c), Khokhlov, Ashvetia (Pimenov, 88).

 September 30, 2003 / FC Lokomotiv Moscow -  Arsenal 0–0 / Lokomotiv Stadium, Moscow / Attendance: 30,000
Lokomotiv: Ovchinnikov, Evseev (Nizhegorodov, 72), Ignashevich, Pashinin, Sennikov, Gurenko, Izmailov, Maminov, Loskov (c), Khokhlov, Ashvetia (Pimenov, 65).
Arsenal: Lehmann, Cole, Keown (c), Pires, Wiltord, Lauren, Henry, Parlour, Edu, Gilberto, Touré.

 October 21, 2003 / FC Lokomotiv Moscow –  Internazionale 3–0 (Loskov  Ashvetia  Khokhlov ) / Lokomotiv Stadium, Moscow / Attendance: 26,000
Lokomotiv: Ovchinnikov, Evseev (Gurenko, 74), Sennikov, Ignashevich, Lekgetho, Izmailov, Maminov, Loskov (c), Khokhlov, Buznikin (Pashinin, 46), Ashvetia.
Internazionale: Toldo, Córdoba, J. Zanetti (c), C. Zanetti, Cruz (Martins, 60), Cannavaro, Recoba, Materazzi (Emre, 60), Almeyda, Bréchet (Coco, 71), Vieri.

 November 5, 2003 / Internazionale - FC Lokomotiv Moscow 1–1 (Recoba  – Loskov ) / San Siro, Milan / Attendance: 35,000
Internazionale: Toldo, Helveg, Materazzi, J. Zanetti (c), Cannavaro, C. Zanetti (Lamouchi, 68), Adani, Almeyda, Kily González (Karagounis, 90), Recoba (Cruz, 76), Vieri.
Lokomotiv: Ovchinnikov, Evseev, Ignashevich, Pashinin, Sennikov, Lekgetho, Izmailov (Nizhegorodov, 90), Maminov, Loskov (c), Khokhlov, Ashvetia (Buznikin, 76).

 November 25, 2003 / FC Lokomotiv Moscow - Dynamo Kyiv 3–2 (Buznikin  Ignashevich  Parks  – Byalkevich  Shatskikh ) / Lokomotiv Stadium, Moscow / Attendance: 28,000
Lokomotiv: Ovchinnikov (c), Evseev, Ignashevich, Pashinin, Sennikov, Lekgetho, Maminov, Loskov, Khokhlov, Buznikin (Parks, 83), Ashvetia (Nizhegorodov, 92).
Dynamo Kyiv: Shovkovskyi, Dmytrulin, Byalkevich (c), Rincón, Shatskikh, Ghioane (Khatskevich, 57), Husyev, Onyshchenko (Peev, 66), Nesmachniy, Gavrančić, Sablić.

 December 10, 2003 / Arsenal - FC Lokomotiv Moscow 2–0 (Pires  Ljungberg ) / Highbury, London / Attendance: 35,343
Arsenal: Lehmann, Touré, Cygan, Campbell, Cole, Ljungberg, Gilberto, Vieira (c), Pires, Bergkamp (Kanu, 75), Henry.
Lokomotiv: Ovchinnikov, Evseev, Ignashevich, Pashinin, Sennikov, Lekgetho , Maminov, Khokhlov, Loskov (c), Buznikin (Gurenko, 46), Ashvetia (Parks, 46).

First knockout round
 February 24, 2004 / FC Lokomotiv Moscow –  Monaco 2–1 (Izmailov  Maminov  – Morientes ) / Lokomotiv Stadium, Moscow / Attendance: 26,000
Lokomotiv: Ovchinnikov, Evseev, Pashinin, Asatiani, Sennikov, Gurenko, Izmailov (Parks, 79), Loskov (c), Maminov, Khokhlov (Nizhegorodov, 83), Ashvetia (Obiorah, 46).
Monaco: Roma, Ibarra, Rodriguez (c), Givet, Evra, Cissé, Bernardi, Zikos, Rothen, Pršo (Adebayor, 64), Morientes.

 March 10, 2004 / Monaco - FC Lokomotiv Moscow 1–0 (Pršo ) / Stade Louis II, Monaco / Attendance: 18,000
Monaco: Roma, Ibarra, Rodriguez (c), Givet, Evra, Pršo (Plašil, 90), Bernardi, Zikos, Rothen, Adebayor (Cissé, 77), Morientes.
Lokomotiv: Ovchinnikov, Evseev, Nizhegorodov, Asatiani, Pashinin, Sennikov (Gurenko, 65), Izmailov, Maminov, Loskov (c ), Obiorah, Ashvetia (Parks, 67).

UEFA Champions League 2005–06
Manager: Vladimir Eshtrekov.

Second qualifying round
 July 27, 2005 / Rabotnički  - FC Lokomotiv Moscow 1–1 (Nuhiji  – Sychev ) / Gradski Stadion, Skopje / Attendance: 6,000
Rabotnički: Madzovski, Ig. Stojanov (c) (Mihajlović, 72), Karčev, Kralevski, Jovanovski, Trajčev, P. Stojanov, S. Ignatov (Yankep, 90+2), Nuhiji, Maznov (Ilijoski, 75), Pejčić.
Lokomotiv: Ovchinnikov (c), Evseev, Sennikov, Asatiani, Gurenko, Khokhlov (Samedov, 61), Lima, Maminov, Bilyaletdinov, Kanyenda (Lebedenko, 75), Sychev.

 August 3, 2005 / FC Lokomotiv Moscow - Rabotnički 2–0 (Sychev  Asatiani ) / Lokomotiv Stadium, Moscow / Attendance: 19,648
Lokomotiv: Ovchinnikov (c), Evseev, Pashinin, Asatiani, Gurenko, Samedov (Maminov, 72), Bikey, Lima (Sennikov, 82), Khokhlov, Bilyaletdinov (Lebedenko, 89), Sychev.
Rabotnički: Madzovski, Karčev, Kralevski, Ig. Stojanov (c) (Il. Stojanov, 14), Jovanovski, P. Stojanov, Trajčev, S. Ignatov (Yankep, 55), Nuhiji (Ilijoski, 77), Maznov, Pejčić.

Third qualifying round
 August 10, 2005 / Rapid Wien  – FC Lokomotiv Moscow 1–1 (Valachovič  – Samedov ) / Gerhard Hanappi Stadium, Vienna / Attendance: 18,000
Rapid Wien: Payer, Korsós (Dober, 87), Valachovič, Bejbl, Adamski (Dollinger, 78), Hofmann (c), Hlinka, Martínez, Ivanschitz, Akagündüz, Kincl.
Lokomotiv: Ovchinnikov (c), Gurenko, Asatiani, Bikey , Sennikov, Samedov (Pashinin, 76), Maminov, Lima, Khokhlov (Evseev, 90+3), Bilyaletdinov, Lebedenko (Ruopolo, 80).

 August 23, 2005 / FC Lokomotiv Moscow – Rapid Wien 0–1 (Valachovič ) / Lokomotiv Stadium, Moscow / Attendance: 28,000
Lokomotiv: Ovchinnikov (c), Gurenko (Ruopolo, 86), Pashinin, Asatiani, Sennikov, Samedov (Izmailov, 58), Maminov, Khokhlov, Bilyaletdinov, Evseev, Lebedenko.
Rapid Wien: Payer, Dober, Valachovič, Bejbl, Adamski, Hofmann (c), Korsós (Martínez, 75), Hlinka, Ivanschitz, Kincl, Akagündüz (Lawarée, 55).

UEFA Cup 2005–06
Manager: Vladimir Eshtrekov (first round and group stage), Slavoljub Muslin (round of 32).

First round
 September 15, 2005 / Brann  – FC Lokomotiv Moscow 1–2 (Winters  – Ruopolo  Lebedenko ) / Brann Stadion, Bergen / Attendance: 5,000
Brann: Opdal, Sigurðsson, Scharner (Klock, 70), Soma, Hanstveit (c), Sanne (Helegbe, 51), Andresen, Miller, Huseklepp, Walde (Haugen, 75), Winters.
Lokomotiv: Ovchinnikov (c), Evseev (Sennikov, 31), Pashinin, Asatiani, Gurenko, Samedov, Maminov (Bikey, 46), Khokhlov (Lebedenko, 46), Bilyaletdinov, Izmailov, Ruopolo.

 September 29, 2005 / FC Lokomotiv Moscow – Brann 3–2 (Loskov  Asatiani  Bilyaletdinov  – Macallister  Miller ) / Lokomotiv Stadium, Moscow / Attendance: 14,000
Lokomotiv: Ovchinnikov, Gurenko, Sennikov, Asatiani, Kruglov, Izmailov (Bikey, 69), Maminov (Khokhlov, 46), Loskov (c), Lima, Bilyaletdinov, Ruopolo (Lebedenko, 79).
Brann: Opdal , Sigurðsson, Scharner, Soma, Hanstveit (c), Knudsen (Thorbjørnsen, 32), Haugen, Miller, Sanne (Huseklepp, 76), Macallister (Walde, 84), Winters.

Group stage
 October 19, 2005 / FC Lokomotiv Moscow – Espanyol  0–1 (Tamudo ) / Lokomotiv Stadium, Moscow / Attendance: 13,718
Lokomotiv: Ovchinnikov (c), Bugayev (Ruopolo, 69), Pashinin, Sennikov, Gurenko, Izmailov, Bikey, Lima, Asatiani, Bilyaletdinov, Lebedenko.
Espanyol: Iraizoz, David García (Hurtado, 22), Lopo, Pochettino, de la Peña, Luis García (Coro, 72), Ito, Fredson (Eduardo Costa, 67), Zabaleta, Jarque, Tamudo (c).

 November 3, 2005 / Palermo  – FC Lokomotiv Moscow 0–0 / Stadio Renzo Barbera, Palermo / Attendance: 15,823
Palermo: Andújar, Grosso, Barzagli, Ferri, Terlizzi, Masiello, González (Santana, 67), Codrea, Mutarelli (c) (Barone, 46), Pepe, Caracciolo (Makinwa, 44).
Lokomotiv: Ovchinnikov (c), Evseev, Bikey (Gurenko, 77), Asatiani, Sennikov, Lima, Maminov, Khokhlov , Izmailov, Bilyaletdinov, Ruopolo (Lebedenko, 90).

 November 23, 2005 / FC Lokomotiv Moscow – Brøndby  4–2 (Loskov    Lebedenko  – Retov  Skoubo ) / Lokomotiv Stadium, Moscow / Attendance: 8,500
Lokomotiv: Ovchinnikov, Evseev, Bikey, Pashinin, Sennikov, Samedov (Ruopolo, 33), Gurenko, Asatiani, Loskov (c), Bilyaletdinov, Lebedenko (Bugayev, 90+1).
Brøndby: Ankergren, Rytter, Johansen, Nielsen (c), Sennels, Lorentzen (Christensen, 74), Daugaard, Lantz, Retov (Kamper, 46), T. Rasmussen (Absalonsen, 80), Skoubo.

 November 30, 2005 / Maccabi Petah Tikva  – FC Lokomotiv Moscow 0–4 (Loskov  Lebedenko   Ruopolo ) / Ramat Gan Stadium, Ramat Gan / Attendance: 3,500
Maccabi Petah Tikva: Cohen, Amar, Banai, Megamadov (c) (Hadiya, 59), Ganon, Caldeira, Tzemah, Edri (Tuama, 46), Mbamba, Golan, Dubrovin (David, 55).
Lokomotiv: Poliakov, Evseev, Bikey, Pashinin, Sennikov, Gurenko (Bugayev, 80), Asatiani (Amelyanchuk, 86), Loskov (c), Bilyaletdinov (Kruglov, 83), Lebedenko, Ruopolo.

Round of 32
 February 15, 2006 / FC Lokomotiv Moscow – Sevilla  0–1 (López ) / Lokomotiv Stadium, Moscow / Attendance: 8,500
Lokomotiv: Poliakov, Gurenko, Asatiani, Pashinin, Spahić, Samedov, Kingston (Maminov, 60), Bikey, Loskov (c), Bilyaletdinov (Izmailov, 81), Parks (Lebedenko, 46).
Sevilla: Notario, Alves, Navarro (c), Dragutinović, David, Navas (Escudé, 86), Martí, López, Adriano (Puerta, 78), Kanouté, Fabiano (Saviola, 70).

 February 23, 2006 / Sevilla – FC Lokomotiv Moscow 2–0 (Maresca  Puerta ) / Estadio Ramón Sánchez Pizjuán, Seville / Attendance: 20,000
Sevilla: Notario, Alves, Navarro (c) (Ocio, 82), Dragutinović, David, Navas, Maresca, López, Puerta, Fabiano (Kepa, 69), Saviola (Adriano, 46).
Lokomotiv: Poliakov, Spahić, Pashinin, Asatiani, Gurenko, Samedov (Parks, 68), Bikey, Maminov, Loskov (c), Bilyaletdinov (Izmailov, 60), Lebedenko.

UEFA Cup 2006–07
Manager: Slavoljub Muslin.

First round
 September 14, 2006 / FC Lokomotiv Moscow – Zulte Waregem  2–1 (Loskov  Ivanović  – Vandermarliere ) / Lokomotiv Stadium, Moscow / Attendance: 11,023
Lokomotiv: Jakupović, Spahić (Evseev, 90+2), Asatiani, Ivanović, Fininho, Gurenko, Celsinho (O'Connor, 46), Loskov (c), Bilyaletdinov, Sychev, Traoré (Izmailov, 81).
Zulte Waregem: Merlier, Reina, De Brul, Leleu (c), Minne, Vandermarliere, Janssens (Van Steenbrugghe, 83), Verschuère, Sergeant, Matthys (Datti, 77), Mrđa (Vandendriessche, 65).

 September 28, 2006 / Zulte Waregem – FC Lokomotiv Moscow 2–0 (Matthys  Sergeant ) / Jules Ottenstadion, Ghent / Attendance: 5,000
Zulte Waregem: De Vlieger, Minne (D'Haemers, 63), De Brul, Dindeleux, Reina, Matthys, Sergeant, Janssens, Verschuère, Meert, Datti (Mrđa, 59).
Lokomotiv: Poliakov, Evseev, Pashinin, Ivanović, Sennikov, Kingston (Izmailov, 46), Zouagi (Bilyaletdinov, 62), Gurenko, Loskov (c), O'Connor (Sychev, 62), Traoré.

UEFA Cup 2007–08
Manager: Anatoly Byshovets (first round and first two matches at group stage), Rinat Bilyaletdinov (last two matches at group stage).

First round
 September 20, 2007 / FC Midtjylland  – FC Lokomotiv Moscow 1–3 (Babatunde  – Samedov  Bilyaletdinov  Sychev ) / SAS Arena, Herning / Attendance: 6,000
Midtjylland: Raška, C. Poulsen, Klimpl, Troest, Afriyie, S. Poulsen, Oluwafemi, Thygesen, Madsen (c) (D. Olsen, 67), Kristensen (Dadu, 78), Babatunde (C. Olsen, 74).
Lokomotiv: Pelizzoli, Ivanović, Yefimov, Asatiani, Sennikov, Yanbayev (Samedov, 52), Maminov, Gurenko, Bilyaletdinov (c), Odemwingie, Sychev.

 October 4, 2007 / FC Lokomotiv Moscow – FC Midtjylland 2–0 (Bilyaletdinov  Maminov ) / Lokomotiv Stadium, Moscow / Attendance: 9,600
Lokomotiv: Pelizzoli, Ivanović, Yefimov (Rodolfo, 41), Asatiani, Sennikov (Yanbayev, 46), Spahić, Maminov (Samedov, 58), Gurenko, Bilyaletdinov (c), Odemwingie, Sychev.
Midtjylland: Raška, C. Poulsen, Klimpl, Troest, Afriyie, S. Poulsen (Jessen, 57), Oluwafemi, Thygesen, D. Olsen, Dadu, Babatunde (Kristensen, 46).

Group B
 October 25, 2007 / FC Lokomotiv Moscow – Atlético Madrid  3–3 (Bilyaletdinov  Odemwingie   – Agüero   Forlán ) / Lokomotiv Stadium, Moscow / Attendance: 13,000
Lokomotiv: Pelizzoli, Ivanović, Yefimov (Yanbayev, 60), Rodolfo, Sennikov, Samedov (Cociş, 81), Gurenko (Maminov, 90+1), Spahić, Bilyaletdinov (c), Sychev, Odemwingie.
Atlético Madrid: Abbiati, López, Ibáñez, Fabiano Eller, Pernía, Jurado (Maniche, 75), Cléber Santana (Maxi Rodríguez, 69), Forlán, Raúl García, Simão (Luis García, 69), Agüero.

 November 8, 2007 / Aberdeen F.C.  – FC Lokomotiv Moscow 1–1 (Diamond  – Ivanović ) / Pittodrie Stadium, Aberdeen / Attendance: 18,843
Aberdeen: Langfield, Hart, Diamond, Considine, Foster, Clark (Maguire, 67), Nicholson, Severin, Aluko (de Visscher, 81), Young, Miller (Lovell, 86).
Lokomotiv: Pelizzoli, Ivanović, Asatiani, Rodolfo, Sennikov, Samedov (Cociş, 79), Spahić, Gurenko, Bilyaletdinov (c), Odemwingie, Sychev.

 November 29, 2007 / FC Lokomotiv Moscow – F.C. Copenhagen  0–1 (Nordstrand ) / Lokomotiv Stadium, Moscow / Attendance: 11,000
Lokomotiv: Pelizzoli, Ivanović, Rodolfo, Asatiani, Spahić , Gurenko, Maminov, Bilyaletdinov (c), Odemwingie (Samedov, 46), Sychev (Cociş, 85), Traoré.
Copenhagen: Christiansen, Antonsson, Gravgaard (c), Hangeland, Wendt, Kvist, Würtz (Sionko, 32), Nørregaard, Hutchinson, Nordstrand (Aílton, 79), Allbäck.

 December 5, 2007 / Panathinaikos F.C.  – FC Lokomotiv Moscow 2–0 (Salpingidis  ) / Apostolos Nikolaidis Stadium, Athens / Attendance: 8,000
Panathinaikos: Galinović, Vyntra, Morris, Sarriegi, Fyssas, Romero (Ninis, 82), Tziolis, Mate Junior, Dimoutsos (Karagounis, 66), Papadopoulos, N'Doye (Salpingidis, 63).
Lokomotiv: Pelizzoli, Ivanović, Asatiani, Sennikov, Yanbayev, Samedov (A. Kuznetsov, 64), Gurenko, Maminov (Fomin, 82), Bilyaletdinov (c), Traoré (Korchagin, 86), Cociş.

UEFA Europa League 2010–11
Manager: Yuri Semin.

Play-off round

 August 19, 2010 / Lausanne  – FC Lokomotiv Moscow 1–1 (Y. Traoré  – Sychev ) / Stade Olympique de la Pontaise, Lausanne / Attendance: 13,000
Lausanne: Favre, Y. Traoré, Buntschu, Meoli, Sonnerat, Carrupt (Stadelmann, 82), Celestini (c), Marazzi, Avanzini (Kilinc, 85), Silvio (Roux, 72), Munsy.
Lokomotiv: Guilherme, Shishkin, Rodolfo, Burlak, Yanbayev, Glushakov (Loskov, 67), Tarasov, Maicon (D. Traoré, 46), Aliyev, Torbinski (Gatagov, 70), Sychev (c).

 August 26, 2010 / FC Lokomotiv Moscow – Lausanne 1–1 (Aliyev  – Silvio ), pen. 3–4 (Aliyev  Sychev  Loskov  Shishkin  Maicon  – Silvio  Carrupt  Rodrigo  Katz  Celestini ) / Lokomotiv Stadium, Moscow / Attendance: 11,053
Lokomotiv: Guilherme, Shishkin, Baša, Rodolfo (Loskov, 68), Yanbayev, Gatagov, Asatiani (Tarasov, 46), Torbinski (Maicon, 77), Aliyev, Sychev (c), D. Traoré.
Lausanne: Favre (Castejon, 90+3), Y. Traoré, Katz, Meoli, Sonnerat, Carrupt, Celestini (c), Marazzi, Avanzini (Kilinc, 78), Silvio, Munsy (Rodrigo, 51).

UEFA Europa League 2011–12
Manager:  José Couceiro.

Play-off round

 August 18, 2011 / Lokomotiv Moscow – Spartak Trnava  2–0 (Yanbayev  Maicon ) / Lokomotiv Stadium, Moscow / Attendance: 12,402
Lokomotiv: Guilherme, Shishkin, da Costa, Ďurica, Yanbayev, Tarasov, Glushakov, Ignatyev (Obinna, 69), Ibričić (Zapater, 65), Maicon, Sychev (c) (Caicedo, 81).
Spartak Trnava: Raška (c), Koubský, Procházka, L.Hanzel, Diallo, Gross, Karhan, Bicák (Ciprys, 90), Kaščák, Vyskočil (Malcharek, 54), Oravec (Bernáth, 72)

 August 25, 2011 / Spartak Trnava  – Lokomotiv Moscow 1–1 (Yanbayev  – Obinna ) / Štadión Antona Malatinského, Trnava / Attendance: 14,000
Spartak Trnava: Raška (c) , Čvirik, Koubský, L.Hanzel, P.Čarnota , Karhan, Bicák (Koné, 72), Kaščák, Vyskočil (Malcharek, 61 ), Tomaček, Oravec (Slovenčiak, 78)
Lokomotiv: Guilherme, Shishkin, da Costa, Ďurica, Yanbayev, Tarasov (Ibričić, 86), Glushakov, Obinna (Ignatyev, 89), Loskov (c) (Ozdoyev, 61), Maicon, Sychev.

Group L
 September 15, 2011 / SK Sturm Graz  – FC Lokomotiv Moscow 1–2 (Szabics  – Obinna  Sychev ) / Stadion Graz-Liebenau, Graz / Attendance: 13,356
Sturm Graz: Čavlina, Popkhadze, Feldhofer (Pürcher, 46), Weber (c), Hölzl (Kainz, 21), Muratović (Haas, 66), Szabics, Burgstaller, Standfest, Bodul, Wolf.
Lokomotiv: Guilherme, Shishkin, Burlak, Ďurica, Yanbayev, Ozdoyev, Glushakov, Ibričić (Zapater, 46), Obinna (Ignatyev, 69), Sychev (c) (Caicedo, 76), Maicon.

 September 29, 2011 / FC Lokomotiv Moscow – R.S.C. Anderlecht  0–2 (Suárez  Mbokani ) / Lokomotiv Stadium, Moscow / Attendance: 11,495
Lokomotiv: Guilherme, Shishkin, da Costa, Burlak, Yanbayev (Ignatyev, 78), Zapater, Ozdoyev (Loskov, 40), Glushakov, Obinna, Sychev (c) (Caicedo, 78), Maicon.
Anderlecht: Proto, Biglia (c), Suárez (Mareček, 74), Kanu (Odoi, 90), Kouyaté, Kljestan, Safari, Juhász, Wasilewski, Gillet, Canesin (Mbokani, 60).

 October 20, 2011 / FC Lokomotiv Moscow – AEK Athens F.C.  3–1 (Sychev   Caicedo  – Sialmas ) / Lokomotiv Stadium, Moscow / Attendance: 8,279
Lokomotiv: Guilherme, Shishkin, da Costa, Burlak, Yanbayev, Zapater, Glushakov, Ibričić (Caicedo, 66), Ignatyev (Loskov, 78), Sychev (c), Maicon (Obinna, 46).
AEK Athens: Arabatzis (c), Kontoes, Manolas, Cala, Beleck, José Carlos, Karabelas, Lagos (Sialmas, 73), Vargas (Kafes, 58), Burns (Leonardo, 65), Gentsoglou.

 November 3, 2011 / AEK Athens F.C.  – FC Lokomotiv Moscow 1–3 (Leonardo  – Glushakov  Maicon  Ignatyev ) / Olympic Stadium, Athens / Attendance: 3,000
AEK Athens: Arabatzis, Helgason (Kontoes, 46), Manolas, Beleck, José Carlos, Sialmas (Roger, 69), Makos, Lagos, Burns (Leonardo, 46), Georgeas (c), Gentsoglou.
Lokomotiv: Guilherme, Shishkin, Ilič, Burlak, Ďurica, Zapater, Glushakov (c), Ibričić (Sychev, 81), Ignatyev (Nurov, 81), Torbinski (Maicon, 61), Obinna.

 December 1, 2011 / FC Lokomotiv Moscow – SK Sturm Graz  3–1 (Maicon  Sychev ) Glushakov  – Kainz  / Lokomotiv Stadium, Moscow / Attendance: 12,426
Lokomotiv: Amelchenko, Shishkin, da Costa, Ďurica, Yanbayev, Zapater, Glushakov, Ibričić (Maicon, 57), Ignatyev, Torbinski (Ozdoyev, 77), Sychev (c) (Minchenkov, 86).
Sturm Graz: Čavlina, Popkhadze, Weber (c), Dudić, Neuhold, Ehrenreich, Standfest (Kainz, 38), Bodul (Haas, 66), Koch, Kienast, Klem (Weinberger, 77).

 December 14, 2011 / R.S.C. Anderlecht  – FC Lokomotiv Moscow 5–3 (Kljestan  Canesin  Wasilewski  Suárez  Gillet  – Ignatyev  Sychev  ) / Constant Vanden Stock Stadium, Brussels / Attendance: 19,700
Anderlecht: Proto (c), Suárez (Mbokani, 73), Jovanović, Kouyaté, Mareček, Kljestan, Safari, Juhász, Wasilewski, Gillet (Badibanga, 81), Canesin (De Sutter, 88).
Lokomotiv: Amelchenko, Ilič, da Costa, Ďurica, A.Ivanov , Zapater, Glushakov, Torbinski (c) (Ozdoyev, 46), Ignatyev, Minchenkov (Sychev, 46), Maicon (Caicedo, 55).

Round of 32
 February 16, 2012 / FC Lokomotiv Moscow – Athletic Bilbao  2–1 (Glushakov  Caicedo  – Muniain ) / Lokomotiv Stadium, Moscow / Attendance: 13,160
Lokomotiv: Guilherme, Shishkin, Burlak, Belyayev, Yanbayev, Zapater, Tarasov, Glushakov (Ozdoyev, 88), Maicon (Sychev, 89), Caicedo, Torbinski (c) (Obinna, 66).
Athletic Bilbao: Iraizoz, Iraola (c), Javi Martínez, Amorebieta, Aurtenetxe (D.López, 79), Iturraspe, Herrera, Susaeta, de Marcos, Muniain, Llorente.

 February 23, 2012 / Athletic Bilbao  – FC Lokomotiv Moscow 1–0 (Muniain ) / San Mamés Stadium, Bilbao / Attendance: 35,000
Athletic Bilbao: Iraizoz, Iraola (c), Javi Martínez, Amorebieta , de Marcos, Iturraspe (I.Pérez, 46), Herrera (Ekiza, 68), Susaeta (San José, 46), Toquero, Muniain, Llorente.
Lokomotiv: Guilherme, Shishkin, Burlak, Belyayev (da Costa, 80), Yanbayev, Zapater, Tarasov, Ozdoyev (Sychev, 66), Glushakov, Caicedo, Torbinski (c) (Obinna, 66).

UEFA Europa League 2014–15
Manager:  Leonid Kuchuk.

Play-off round
 August 21, 2014 / Apollon Limassol  – Lokomotiv Moscow 1–1 (Guie Guie  – Kasaev ) / GSP Stadium, Nicosia / Attendance: 9,300
Apollon Limassol: Vale, Stylianou (Mulder, 70), Merkis (c), João Paulo, Vasiliou (Thuram, 79), Hamdani, Gullón, Papoulis, Meriem (Rezek, 69), Robert, Guie Guie.
Lokomotiv: Guilherme (c), Shishkin, Ćorluka, Ďurica, Denisov , Tsiharaw , Tarasov (Mykhalyk, 65), Samedov, Fernandes, Kasaev (Maicon, 62), Niasse (N'Doye, 46).

 August 28, 2014 / Lokomotiv Moscow – Apollon Limassol  1–4 (Pavlyuchenko  – Rezek  Papoulis  Thuram  Hugo López ) / Lokomotiv Stadium, Moscow / Attendance: 6,520
Lokomotiv: Guilherme (c), Shishkin, Ćorluka, Ďurica, Seraskhov, Pejčinović, Tarasov, Kasaev (Samedov, 67), Fernandes (Al. Miranchuk, 53), Maicon, Niasse (Pavlyuchenko, 53).
Apollon Limassol: Vale, Stylianou, Merkis (c), João Paulo, Robert, Hamdani, Gullón (Charalambous, 87), Papoulis (Hugo López, 81), Meriem (Thuram, 64), Sangoy, Rezek.

UEFA Europa League 2015–16
Manager:  Igor Cherevchenko.

Group H
 September 17, 2015 / Sporting Lisbon  – FC Lokomotiv Moscow 1–3 (Montero  – Samedov   Niasse ) / Jose Alvalade, Lisbon / Attendance: 25,400
Sporting: Rui Patrício, João Pereira, Paulo Oliveira, Tobias Figueiredo, Jefferson Nascimento, Aquilani (André Martins, 71), T.Gutiérrez, Carlos Mané (Ruiz, 63), Adrien Silva (c), Gelson Martins, Montero (Slimani, 63).
Lokomotiv: Guilherme, Shishkin, Ćorluka (c), Pejčinović, Denisov, N'Dinga, Tarasov (Mykhalyk, 86), Samedov, M.Fernandes (Kolomeytsev, 81), Maicon (Grigoryev, 82), Niasse.

 October 1, 2015 / FC Lokomotiv Moscow – KF Skënderbeu  2–0 (Niasse  Samedov ) / Lokomotiv Stadium, Moscow / Attendance: 10,340
Lokomotiv: Guilherme, Yanbayev, Ćorluka (c), Pejčinović, Logashov, Tarasov, Samedov, Kolomeytsev (N'Dinga, 66), M.Fernandes (Al.Miranchuk, 46), Maicon, Niasse (Škuletić, 81).
Skënderbeu: Shehi (c), Vangjeli, Radas, Jashanica, Abazi (Arapi, 77), Lilaj, Nimaga, Latifi (Shkëmbi, 71), Olayinka (Progni, 87), B.Berisha, Salihi.

 October 22, 2015 / FC Lokomotiv Moscow – Beşiktaş J.K.  1–1 (Maicon  – Mario Gomez ) / Lokomotiv Stadium, Moscow / Attendance: 19,124
Lokomotiv: Guilherme, Shishkin, Ćorluka (c) , Mykhalyk, Denisov, Kolomeytsev, N'Dinga, Samedov, M.Fernandes (Ďurica, 73), Maicon (Kasaev, 80), Niasse (Grigoryev, 88).
Beşiktaş: Zengin (c), Beck, Rhodolfo, Gülüm, Köybaşı, Hutchinson, Özyakup, Töre (Tosun, 65), J.Sosa (Uysal, 57), Quaresma (K.Frei, 87), M.Gómez.

 November 5, 2015 / Beşiktaş J.K.  – FC Lokomotiv Moscow 1–1 (Quaresma  – Niasse ) / Atatürk Stadium, Istanbul / Attendance: 24,690
Beşiktaş: Zengin (c), Beck, Rhodolfo, Gülüm, Köybaşı, Hutchinson, Özyakup (Tosun, 83), Töre, J.Sosa (Uysal, 72), Şahan (Quaresma, 46), M.Gómez.
Lokomotiv: Guilherme, Yanbayev, Shishkin, Ďurica, Denisov, N'Dinga, Kolomeytsev, Samedov (c), M.Fernandes (Al.Miranchuk, 74), Maicon (Grigoryev, 90), Niasse (Škuletić, 90).

 November 26, 2015 / FC Lokomotiv Moscow – Sporting Lisbon  2–4 (Maicon  Al.Miranchuk  – Montero  Ruiz  Gelson Martins  Matheus Pereira ) / Lokomotiv Stadium, Moscow / Attendance: 11,043
Lokomotiv: Guilherme, Shishkin, Mykhalyk, Ďurica, Denisov, N'Dinga, Tarasov (Kolomeytsev, 64), Samedov (c), M.Fernandes (Al.Miranchuk, 78), Maicon (Kasaev, 81), Niasse.
Sporting: Boeck, Esgaio, Naldo, Ewerton, J.Silva, Adrien Silva (c), Gelson Martins, João Mário (Aquilani, 79), Matheus Pereira (André Martins, 67), Montero (Slimani, 71), Ruiz.

 December 10, 2015 / KF Skënderbeu  – FC Lokomotiv Moscow 0–3 (Tarasov  Niasse  Samedov ) / Elbasan Arena, Elbasan / Attendance: 1,152
Skënderbeu: Shehi (c), Ademir, Radas, Jashanica, Abazi, Lilaj, Esquerdinha (Djair, 82), Latifi (Progni, 72), Olayinka, B.Berisha, Salihi.
Lokomotiv: Guilherme, Shishkin, Mykhalyk (Ďurica, 82), Pejčinović, Denisov, N'Dinga, Tarasov, Samedov (c), Kolomeytsev, Kasaev (Maicon, 75), Niasse (Al.Miranchuk, 90).

Round of 32
 February 16, 2016 / Fenerbahçe S.K.  – FC Lokomotiv Moscow 2–0 (Souza  ) / Şükrü Saracoğlu Stadium, Istanbul / Attendance: 36,195
Fenerbahce: Fabiano, Gönül (c), Kjær, Bruno Alves, Erkin, Tufan, Topal, Souza (Kadlec, 84), Nani, van Persie (Fernandão, 77), Şen (Potuk, 78).
Lokomotiv: Guilherme, Yanbayev, Pejčinović, Ďurica, Denisov, N'Dinga, Tarasov, Samedov (c), M.Fernandes, Kasaev (Maicon, 62; Mykhalyk, 75), Škuletić (Al.Miranchuk, 79).

 February 25, 2016 / FC Lokomotiv Moscow – Fenerbahçe S.K.  1–1 (Samedov  – Topal ) / Lokomotiv Stadium, Moscow / Attendance: 12,695
Lokomotiv: Guilherme, Pejčinović, Ćorluka (c), Ďurica, Denisov, Kolomeytsev, N'Dinga (Mykhalyk, 13), Samedov, M.Fernandes (Škuletić, 73), Kasaev (Zhemaletdinov, 81), Al.Miranchuk.
Fenerbahce: Fabiano, Gönül (c) (Özbayraklı, 44), Kjær, Bruno Alves, Kaldırım, Tufan (Kadlec, 74), Topal, Souza, Nani (Potuk, 79), van Persie, Şen.

UEFA Europa League 2017–18
Manager:  Yuri Semin.

Group F
 September 14, 2017 / F.C. Copenhagen  – FC Lokomotiv Moscow 0–0  / Parken Stadium, Copenhagen / Attendance: 17,285
Copenhagen: Robin Olsen, Benjamin Verbic, Zeca (William Kvist, 86), Andrija Pavlovic, Jan Gregus, Kasper Kusk (Rasmus Falk, 62), Denis Vavro, Nicolai Boilesen(c), Peter Ankersen, Michael Luftner, Pieros Sotiriou.
Lokomotiv: Guilherme, Fernandes, Pejčinović, Farfan (Eder, 71), Ignatyev, Tarasov, Mykhalyk, Denisov (c), Rybus, Kverkvelia, Aleksei Miranchuk (Miranchuk, 82).
 September 28, 2017/ FC Lokomotiv Moscow – FC Fastav Zlin  3–0 (Fernandes   ) / RZD Arena, Moscow / Attendance: 10,065
Lokomotiv: Guilherme, Fernandes, Pejčinović, Farfan (Miranchuk, 46), Ignatyev (Rotenberg, 88), Tarasov, Eder, Denisov (c), Kverkvelia, Aleksei Miranchuk (Kolomeytsev, 78), Lysov.
Zlín: Dostál, Diop (Beauguel, 79), Jiráček (c), Traoré, Holzer, Matejov (Kopečný, 65), Gajić, Bačo, Ekpai, Železník (Mehanović, 46), Vukadinović
 October 19, 2017 / FC Sheriff Tiraspol  1–1 FC Lokomotiv Moscow
 November 2, 2017 / FC Lokomotiv Moscow 1–2 FC Sheriff Tiraspol 
 November 23, 2017 / FC Lokomotiv Moscow 2–1 F.C. Copenhagen 
 December 7, 2017 / FC Fastav Zlin  0–2 FC Lokomotiv Moscow

External links
 

FC Lokomotiv Moscow
Lokomotiv Moscow